Christa Randzio-Plath (born 29 October 1940) is a German lawyer and politician. She was a Member of the European Parliament from 1989 to 2004, representing the Social Democratic Party of Germany.

She was born in Racibórz, Poland.

From 1986 to 1989 she was a member of the Hamburg Parliament. She was an elected member of the 3rd (1989-1994), 4th (1994-1999) and 5th sessions of the European Parliament.

She is a member of the law firm of Rechtsanwälte Mille, Sieberth & Randzio-Plath.

References

External links

1940 births
Living people
MEPs for Germany 1989–1994
MEPs for Germany 1994–1999
MEPs for Germany 1999–2004
20th-century women MEPs for Germany
21st-century women MEPs for Germany
Social Democratic Party of Germany MEPs
German women lawyers
20th-century German lawyers
21st-century German lawyers
20th-century women lawyers
21st-century women lawyers